Matthieu Ugalde (born 10 June 1992) is a French professional rugby union player. He currently plays for Grenoble in the Top 14 having formerly played for Bayonne.

References

External links
Ligue Nationale De Rugby Profile
European Professional Club Rugby Profile
Bayonne Profile

Aviron Bayonnais players
Living people
Sportspeople from Bayonne
1992 births
French rugby union players
Rugby union centres
FC Grenoble players
CA Brive players